Sherard is an unincorporated community located in Coahoma County, Mississippi, United States.

History
Sherard is named for the Sherard family, who cleared the land for a plantation in 1874. The plantation originally had two cotton gins, a saw mill, and pecan processing equipment. Sherard is located on the former Yazoo and Mississippi Valley Railroad and in 1910 was home to four general stores and the Memphis Shingle Company. A post office first began operation under the name Sherard in 1890.

Sherard is served by the Coahoma County School District. Residents are served by Sherard Elementary School and Coahoma County Junior-Senior High School.

A cultivar of pecan known as Sherard was developed in Sherard in 1916.

Notable person

Lewis C. Hudson, Brigadier General in the Marine Corps, lived in Sherard in the 1920s.

References

Unincorporated communities in Coahoma County, Mississippi
Unincorporated communities in Mississippi